Chineme Martins was a Nigerian footballer who played as a midfielder for Nasarawa United. During a league game against Katsina United in March 2020, Martins collapsed on the pitch and was taken to Dalhatu Araf Specialist Hospital, where he was pronounced dead.

Career statistics

Club

Notes

References

Year of birth missing
1990s births
2020 deaths
Nigerian footballers
Association football midfielders
Nasarawa United F.C. players
Nigeria Professional Football League players